The third season of 7th Heaven—an American family-drama television series, created and produced by Brenda Hampton—premiered on September 21, 1998, on The WB, and concluded on May 24, 1999 (22 episodes).

Cast and characters

Main 
Stephen Collins as Eric Camden
Catherine Hicks as Annie Camden
Barry Watson as Matt Camden
David Gallagher as Simon Camden
Jessica Biel as Mary Camden
Beverley Mitchell as Lucy Camden
Mackenzie Rosman as Ruthie Camden
Happy as Happy the Dog

Note: Nikolas and Lorenzo Brino portray Sam and David Camden (episodes 14-22), but are uncredited until season 6.

Episodes

References

1998 American television seasons
1999 American television seasons
Pregnancy-themed television shows